"Wild Women" is a song by Danish soft rock band Michael Learns to Rock, released as the second single from the 1993 album Colours.

Chart performance
"Wild Women" reached number 52 on the German charts, making it their greatest success in Germany.

Live 
During live performances, singer and keyboardist Jascha Richter often performs "Für Elise" on a classical piano before fading into the leitmotif of "Wild Women".

References

External links
 Music video at YouTube

1993 songs
1993 singles
Michael Learns to Rock songs
Songs written by Jascha Richter